MS Schwabenland was a German catapult ship owned by the Deutsche Luft Hansa. It took part in the 1938-1939 Third German Antarctic Expedition.

Characteristics
It was converted into a catapult ship in 1934; a Heinkel-built K-9 catapult was installed on the ship's stern, along with a crane for lifting aircraft.

Lufthansa air mail
Lufthansa sought to engage in air mail service to the Americas using seaplanes launched off catapult ships, with Schwabenland being the second of those ships.

Two Dornier Do 18 Lufthansa seaplanes christened Zephir and Aeolus were used for air mail flights from the Azores to the United States and from Fernando de Noronha to Natal.

Third German Antarctic Expedition

Schwabenland was borrowed from Lufthansa for the 1938-1939 Third German Antarctic Expedition. The ship sailed in secret from Hamburg on 17 December 1938, carrying a complement of 82 men and two Dornier Wal seaplanes. The ship contacted the German whaling fleet off Bouvet Island, then anchored near the edge of the pack ice at 69°14′S, 4°30′W.  After the expedition had completed its work, Schwabenland headed north on 6 February 1939, reaching Germany again on 11 April.

World War II and fate

In October 1939 Schwabenland entered Luftwaffe service and used Blohm & Voss BV 138 seaplanes. After the fall of France it was stationed off the coast of Occupied France, based from the ports of Le Havre and Boulogne.

In August 1942 it was transferred to Tromsø, Norway.

The ship was damaged and forced to beach by the British submarine  in 1944 which was attacking a convoy off Flekkefjord, Norway. Schwabenland was then run aground at Sildeneset in Abelnes Harbour, and later refloated. When the war ended, the ship was taken by the British, and on 31 December 1946 it was loaded with poison gas ammunition, and scuttled in the Skagerrak.

References

Bibliography

External links
 The Interesting History of the Lufthansa Catapult Ships
 Wreck site
 Photos

1925 ships
Ships built in Kiel
Steamships of Germany
World War II merchant ships of Germany
Scuttled vessels
Maritime incidents in March 1944
World War II naval ships of Germany
Seaplane tenders
Maritime incidents in 1946